Mount Awu is the largest volcano in the Sangihe chain, located on Sangir Island in North Sulawesi, Indonesia.   Powerful eruptions occurred in 1711, 1812, 1856, 1822, 1892, and 1966 with devastating pyroclastic flows and lahars that have resulted in 11,048 fatalities.  A total of 18 eruptions are recorded from 1640, with two of VEI 4 (1814 and 1966)  and 3 with VEI 3 (1711, 1856 and 1892), one eruption every ~ 20 years. The hazardous nature of the volcano is determined from the continuos lava source driven by the geodynamic setting (a double subduction line that creates an arc to arc collision) and the presence of a crater lake, sustained by the consistent rainfall on the island, on top of a lava dome. This setting create the condition for a water injection in the lava dome that can cause a water-magma explosion. 

A 4.5 km wide crater is found at the summit and a deep valley forms a passageway for lahars, splitting the flanks from the crater.  This is a volcano in the Ring of Fire.

See also 

 List of volcanoes in Indonesia

References 

Stratovolcanoes of Indonesia
Active volcanoes of Indonesia
Mountains of North Sulawesi
VEI-4 volcanoes
Landforms of the Celebes Sea
Landforms of North Sulawesi
20th-century volcanic events
19th-century volcanic events
18th-century volcanic events
Volcanic crater lakes
Holocene stratovolcanoes